Our Miss Doctor is a 1940 German comedy film directed by Erich Engel and starring Jenny Jugo, Albert Matterstock and Heinz Salfner. It was shot at the Tempelhof Studios in Berlin. The film's sets were designed by the art director Karl Haacker and Karl Weber.

Synopsis
A male teacher at a school slowly comes to appreciate one of his female colleagues both as a teacher and a woman.

Cast
 Jenny Jugo as Dr. Elisabeth Hansen
 Albert Matterstock as Dr. Karl Klinger
 Heinz Salfner as Der Direktor
 Hans Schwarz Jr. as Turnlehrer Jahnke
 Hans Richter as Heinz Müller, Primaner
 Gustav Waldau as Schuldiener Nießer
 Josefine Dora as Frau Nießner
 Hugo Werner-Kahle as Der Schulrat
 Werner Pledath as Der Chefarzt der Klinik
 Paul Bildt as Ein Universitätsprofessor
 Gunnar Möller as Ernst Schultze, Sextaner
 Rainer Penkert as Bierlinger, Primaner
 Rudolf Reinhard as Hans Vogelsang, Sextaner
 Horst Rossius as Fritz Bührle, Sextaner
 Bruno Roth as Alfred Zimmermann, Primaner
 Helmut Withrich as Wolfgang Schumann, Primaner
 Karl Hannemann
 Wolfgang Heise
 John Pauls-Harding

References

Bibliography 
 Hake, Sabine. Popular Cinema of the Third Reich. University of Texas Press, 2001.

External links 
 

1940 films
Films of Nazi Germany
German comedy films
1940 comedy films
1940s German-language films
Films directed by Erich Engel
Films about educators
German black-and-white films
1940s German films
Films shot at Tempelhof Studios